Tony Ameneiro (born 1959 London, UK arrived Australia 1968) is an Australian contemporary visual artist whose work focuses around his drawing and printmaking practice.

Biography
Ameneiro was born in London in 1959 to Spanish parents and emigrated to Australia in 1968. He studied at the Alexander Mackie College of Advanced Education 1979–1981. During his time at art school, he met Graeme Synold and together they formed the Post-punk group, Tablewaiters in 1980. With Ameneiro on synthesiser and Synold on lead vocals, they were soon joined by other band members. As a member of Tablewaiters, Ameneiro provided the cover artwork for their single, "Scattered Visions" (1984)

Known for his figurative work that often centres around references to art history, botany and landscape, Ameneiro works primarily in printmaking, etching, lithography, monotyping, painting, drawing.
Ameneiro was the winner of the 2007 Fremantle Print Award. He has been twice selected as commissioned print-artist for the Print Council of Australia. He has also been a three-time finalist in the Dobell Prize in 2003 2006 and 2012.
His work is represented in select major private and corporate collections, as well as public and university museum collections nationally and internationally including the British Museum, National Gallery of Australia, Art Gallery of New South Wales, Queensland Art Gallery, State Library of Victoria and the Art Gallery of South Australia. Illustrated essays, articles and reviews on his work have been published in selected Australian newspapers and recognised art press including  The Australian, Art Monthly Australia, Print Council of Australia's (PCA) quarterly journal IMPRINT Periphery and Artlink Magazine.
He has been a regular artist in residence at the Art Vault Mildura, along with other artists such as Geoffrey Ricardo Mike Parr and Rick Amor. His studio has editioned prints for various Australian artists including the 2011 Archibald Prize winning artist Ben Quilty and the 2011 Dobell Prize winner Anne Judell. He is based in Mittagong, New South Wales, Australia.

References

External links
  Artist's website
 Images of Ameneiro's work held by the Art Gallery of New South Wales  Art Gallery of New South Wales online collection listing
 Images of Ameneiro's work held by the Art Gallery of South Australia  Art Gallery of South Australia online collection listing
 Images of Ameneiro's work held by the National Gallery of Australia   National Gallery of Australia online collection listing
 Images of Ameneiro's work held by the British Museum  British Museum online collection listing

Further reading

Artists from London
Australian printmakers
Australian people of Spanish descent
English people of Spanish descent
English emigrants to Australia
1959 births
Living people
Date of birth missing (living people)
Print Council of Australia